A direct-drive simulator steering wheel (sometimes abbreviated "DD") is a simulator steering wheel with a direct-drive mechanism between the drive and output, i.e. without gearing (as opposed to simulator steering wheels with reduction gearing via gears or belts), and is used similarly as with other simulator steering wheels for providing torque feedback (often called ""force" feedback") so that the driver, through movement in the steering wheel, gets an interface for sensing what is happening to the car in the simulator. It is an example of human-machine interaction in driving simulators, racing simulators and racing video games, and is an example of haptic technology 

Direct-drive steering wheels typically differ from geared or belted sim racing wheels by being stronger (having more torque), and being able to more accurately reproduce details from the simulator. They are typically constructed using a 3-phase brushless AC servomotor (on more expensive models), or sometimes a hybrid stepper-servomotor, or only a stepper motor (on very affordable models).

History 

Direct-drive mechanisms for use in industrial arms began to be possible in the 1980s, with the use of rare-earth magnetic materials, of which today the most commonly used are neodymium magnets.

Before the 1980s, servo motors were not powerful enough (did not have enough torque) to be used directly, and therefore reduction gears or mechanical belts were added to the motor to leverage and multiply its power. Higher power motors were not feasible due to the expensive rare-earth materials needed to build them. This problem was surpassed in the 1980s, with the development of less expensive high power magnets.

In 2013, direct-drive sim steering wheels were introduced in large scale to the consumer mass market as a more advanced alternative to gear- and belt-driven steering wheels. The first commercially broadly available direct-drive wheel base was released in 2013 by the UK-based Leo Bodnar Electronics, after having been retailing to racing teams and professional centers since 2008. It was followed in 2015 by the US-based SimXperience AccuForce V1, and by the first do it yourself open-source hardware OpenSimwheel or "OSW" kits for users with good technical knowledge.

In 2015, a preliminary comparison of gear-driven and direct drive wheels in the 0–30 Hz frequency range, for a study on hard real-time multibody simulation and high-fidelity steering wheel force feedback, concluded that direct drive wheels are preferable.

Simucube was one of the manufacturers who previously provided Open Sim Wheel kits, and is a brand name owned by the Finnish manufacturer Granite Devices, which also supplies driver electronics for controlling servomotors and stepper motors, both for sim racing and industrial use. Granite Devices started as a hobby project by the Finn Kontkanen Tero when he was building a CNC milling machine, and realised that there was many alternating current servomotors of high quality on the market, but that driver electronics for controlling such motors was expensive or hard to come by. He investigated the operation of AC servos, and realized that it was possible to make usable control electronics with a handful of the latest electronic components and some real-time algorithms. The development of the controller then took around a year. The electronics are based on an IONI motherboard and STM32F4, and a proprietary firmware called MMos. An open source version of this software has been planned for release, but has not yet been released as of 2022.

Performance metrics 
Issues, quality and performance indicators of direct-drive wheels, and of sim racing wheels in general, include detail and fidelity of force feedback, smooth torque transmission, nearly-zero backlash, rotary encoder resolution, clipping, dynamic range, torque ripple, cogging torque, drivers and digital signal processing with control electronics, signal filtering, backdrive friction, low inertia, damping, fast response, precise positioning, electromagnetic interference, and latency.

Construction

Motors 

The Leo Bodnar, OSW kits, Sim-pli.city and VRS systems are based on industrial servo motors (typically MiGE, Lenze, or Kollmorgen motors), while SimXperience's AccuForce, Frex, Simucube (which initially used a MiGE motor), Fanatec, and Simagic use custom-made motors. The types of motors used vary between high-end 3-phase brushless servomotors and lower budget hybrid stepper-servo motors.

Control electronics 
Other than the motor, other parts of a complete direct drive wheel base include a rotary encoder (the position sensor), a controller board (that translate the FFB data from the game into steering wheel forces), and a motor driver board (servo drive), which fits into a slot of the controller board, and  that controls the position, velocity and torque output of the motor. Examples of encoders are the Biss-C and the SinCos encoders, an example of a controller board is the Simucube board, and some examples of motor driver boards are the IONI and the Argon ones.

Torque 
The torque says something about how "powerful" the engine is, and can be specified in two ways:
 Continuous torque, the greatest load of which the motor still can perform continuous movement at a continuous speed, and thus performing continuous work
 Stall torque, the load which will cause the motor to stop so that it can no longer move, and thus produces a holding torque, but not performing any work

The latter always gives a higher number in newton-meters, and is therefore the number that usually is communicated the most by manufacturers to consumers, but is actually a less useful specification since the steering wheel in theory does not perform any work when rotation has stopped. One must therefore be aware of the type of torque specification given when comparing two motors. The relationship between the continuous torque and stall torque can vary between motors, and can say something about the motor characteristics (responsiveness versus strength).

For comparison, usually around 7-10 Nm is experienced in a street car, and on steering wheels very high torque (e.g. 20 Nm) it may therefore be appropriate to adjust the torque down in the software. However, the stronger motors will often have a faster slew rate (the time an amplifier takes to respond to a signal) which gives better steering response and more realism.

Steering wheel mount 
Similar to many real-world racing cars, sim-racing steering wheels usually come with a bolt circle of 6×70 mm, which means the wheel is mounted to the base via 6 evenly spaced out screws along a 70 mm circle on the steering wheel. Other bolt circles are sometimes used.

Some steering wheels attach to the base via quick release, as is commonly seen on many real-world racing cars, and these come in many varieties: Proprietary quick releases (e.g. Fanatec QR1 or Simucube SQR, the latter which has a wedge-shaped dovetail), or standardized quick releases such as the D1 spec (used by many manufacturers, including SimXperience, Simagic, Moza, IMMSource). D1 spec couplers are built to the same pattern as the NRG quick coupler approved for use in real-world racing cars per SFI Spec 42.1. Formerly, another common aftermarket quick release has been the Q1R type (not to be confused with the Fanatec QR1). Some quick releases have (often proprietary) integrated contact pins for transferring power and data to buttons and displays on the wheel, but these usually do not work across manufacturers. Others instead use wireless transmission via Bluetooth and inductive (magnetic) power transfer via the quick release. If using a steering wheel and base from two different manufacturers, it is usually possible to connect the steering wheel electronics to the base via a separate USB cable, for example connecting between USB-C, Micro, Mini or Type B interfaces on the base and wheel.

Base mount 
On bases with a high torque, the most robust mounting is usually achieved using an industry-standard front-mounted flange mount, and this is often preferred among sim racers, as such base mounts usually are less inclined to bend during heavy steering movements. This typically gives a shorter lever and therefore more sturdy mounting due to less torque on the mounting interface. A de facto industry standard among sim wheels, which again stems from a widely used mechanical industry standard, is a front mount with a bolt circle measuring 4×130 mm diameter and metric M8 screws, which means that four screws are evenly placed along a circle measuring 130 mm in diameter. This roughly corresponds to a square of 91.9 mm × 91.9 mm, which is often quoted as a square pattern with 92 mm long sides.

There are also a number of other proprietary patterns for mounting the base to a sim racing cockpit or table. Some of these instead have mounting on the sides or underside of the base.

List of direct drive bases 
Sorted chronologically by time of introduction:

Legend:

See also 
 Racing wheel#Comparison of racing wheels, for a comparison of other types of racing wheels
 Full motion racing simulator
 Linkage (mechanical)
 Motion simulator
 Power steering
 Sawtooth wave
 Servo drive
 Servomechanism
 Virtual reality headset

Notes

References

Further reading
 Berber-Solano, T. P., Giacomin, J. A., & Ajovalasit, M. (2013) Effect of steering wheel acceleration frequency distribution on detection of road type, in Ingeniería mecánica, tecnología y desarrollo, 4(4), 145-151.
 Walmsley, A., & Williams, L. R. T. (1991) The perception of torque pulses, in Perceptual and motor skills, 72(3_suppl), 1223-1227.
 Yang, S., Tan, H. Z., Buttolo, P., & Johnston, M. (2004) Detection of torque vibrations transmitted through a passively-held rotary switch, in Proceedings of EuroHaptics 2004, 217-222.

External links
High end wheel comparison, by Gonzalo at boxthislap.org, December 11, 2017
SinCos impressions, by Gonzalo at boxthislap.org, December 7, 2017
Granite devices and OSW future, by Gonzalo at boxthislap.org, November 5, 2015
 Sim Racing Garage Direct Drive FFB Wheel System Comparison,  Jun 1, 2015
 MMOS Direct drive wheel in 2020, at racedepartment.com, Sept. 3, 2020

Game controllers
Direct-drive sim racing wheels
Racing simulators
Driving simulators